Henri Van Riel (born 31 March 1908, date of death unknown) was a Belgian sailor. He competed in the 6 Metre event at the 1948 Summer Olympics.

References

External links
 

1908 births
Year of death missing
Belgian male sailors (sport)
Olympic sailors of Belgium
Sailors at the 1948 Summer Olympics – 6 Metre
Sportspeople from Antwerp